Dibutylone (bk-DMBDB) is a stimulant drug of the amphetamine, phenethylamine, and cathinone drug classes. It is structurally related to butylone, a designer drug that has been detected in products marketed as bath salts or plant food.

In 2018, dibutylone was the third most common drug of the cathinone class to be identified in Drug Enforcement Administration seizures.

Legal status
In United States, dibutylone is on the list of Schedule I Controlled Substances as a positional isomer of pentylone.

References

Designer drugs
Cathinones
Benzodioxoles